Dermot Brick Molloy (born 199?) is a Gaelic footballer who plays forward for Naomh Conaill and also, formerly, for the Donegal county team.

With a half-century of appearances for his county, he played for Donegal in two All-Ireland senior finals. A fixture in the Donegal teams of the Jim McGuinness era, Molloy won an  All-Ireland Senior Football Championship in 2012 and three Ulster Senior Football Championships, in 2011, 2012 and 2014.

Early life
He was educated at St Eunan's College in Letterkenny. As a ten-year-old he wrote in a scrapbook of his wish to play for Donegal and win an All-Ireland medal.

Playing career

Club
Molloy has had great success with his club Naomh Conaill, winning Championships at under-age level and then the Donegal Senior Football Championship.

He first encountered McGuinness while with his club and first played under him in 2009, a year in which reached the final of the Donegal Senior Football Championship but lost.

He captained the Naomh Conaill team that won the Under-21 Football Championship in 2012. He also played in five consecutive Under-21 Football Championship Finals, winning three from those five.

Molloy scored 1–4 (including one free) for his club in the final of the 2010 Donegal Senior Football Championship. He then finished top scorer overall in the 2010 Ulster Senior Club Football Championship when they reached the final against Crossmaglen Rangers but narrowly missed out on winning the club's first Ulster Football Championship title.

He played for his club in the final of the 2015 Donegal Senior Football Championship. They won.

He made a substitute appearance for his club in the final of the 2019 Donegal Senior Football Championship. They won, following a second replay.

He made a substitute appearance for his club in the final of the 2020 Donegal Senior Football Championship. They won, following extra-time and a penalty shoot-out.

He missed his club's 2022 Comórtas Peile na Gaeltachta Donegal Senior semi-final and final wins as they coincided with his stag party.

Inter-county

Minor
Molloy played minor inter-county football for Donegal in 2008 and 2009.

Under-21
Molloy played for the under-21 footballers in 2010, 2011 and 2012, and captained the team in 2012.

He then played in the final of the 2010 All-Ireland Under-21 Football Championship, which Donegal (managed by Jim McGuinness) narrowly lost to Dublin (managed by Jim Gavin), though Molloy scored five points (including four frees).

Senior
Following the 2010 All-Ireland Under-21 Football Championship final loss, and while returning home to Galway (where he lived with Leo McLoone at the time), Molloy received word that he had been called into the senior county team.

Molloy made his senior inter-county debut against Down in the 2010 Ulster Senior Football Championship quarter-final as a 19-year-old. He scored 1–3 on the day. He was then cited a week later for an incident with Down player Damian Rafferty with a leading elbow. He thus missed Donegal's 2010 All-Ireland Senior Football Championship qualifier match against Armagh in Crossmaglen.

Molloy scored a late goal in the 2011 Ulster Senior Football Championship semi-final victory over Tyrone in Clones.

He was a member of the Donegal panel that won the 2012 All-Ireland Senior Football Championship Final against Mayo, coming on as a substitute for Martin McElhinney in injury time in the second half.

Molloy started Rory Gallagher's first match in charge of the county, a 2015 Dr McKenna Cup away defeat to Derry. He left the team later that month, ahead of the start of the 2015 National Football League.

Honours
Donegal
 All-Ireland Senior Football Championship: 2012
 Ulster Senior Football Championship: 2011, 2012, 2014
 National Football League Division 2: 2011
 All-Ireland Under-21 Football Championship runner-up: 2010
 Ulster Under-21 Football Championship: 2010

Naomh Conaill
 Donegal Senior Football Championship: 2010, 2015
 Donegal Senior League: 2011
 Donegal Under-21 Football Championship: 2008, 2010, 2012 
 Donegal Minor Football Championship: 2009

Individual
 Ulster Gaelic Life Team of the Year: 2010

References

External links
 Molloy holds the Sam Maguire Cup aloft

1990s births
Living people
Donegal inter-county Gaelic footballers
Gaelic football forwards
Naomh Conaill Gaelic footballers
People educated at St Eunan's College
Winners of one All-Ireland medal (Gaelic football)